The Battle of Dormans was fought on 10 October 1575, during the 5th War of Religion in France, between the armies of Henry I, Duke of Guise (i.e. Catholics) and the Huguenot-recruited German army of John Casimir of the Palatinate-Simmern (i.e. Protestants). 

At Dormans, the Duke of Guise was wounded in his face, which gave him the nickname "Le Balafré". According to Penny Richards: "This scar and this name, with which he was thereafter frequently depicted, contributed to his legendary reputation".

Though the Duke of Guise achieved a victory at Dormans, in its aftermath, he was unable to break through the defences of François de Montmorency. The 5th war concluded with the Edict of Beaulieu in May 1576.

References

Sources
 
 

Dormans
Dormans
Conflicts in 1575
1575 in France